Church of Saint Andrew of Morego ( is a Roman Catholic church in the city of Genoa, in the Province of Genoa and the region of Liguria, Italy.

Notes

17th-century Roman Catholic church buildings in Italy
Andrea di Morego
Baroque architecture in Liguria